Finow is a river of Brandenburg, Germany. Originally, it flowed into the Oder near Oderberg, but since the creation of the Finow Canal in the 17th century, it flows into this canal near Finowfurt.

See also
List of rivers of Brandenburg

Rivers of Brandenburg
Rivers of Germany